The Two Coreys is an American reality television series that chronicles the lives of The Coreys, actors Corey Feldman and Corey Haim. Originally announced in 2006 as The Coreys: Return of the Lost Boys, the series premiered July 29, 2007, and aired on A&E for two seasons.

Episodes

Season 1 (2007)

Season 2 (2008)

Sources

External links
 
 

2007 American television series debuts
2008 American television series endings
2000s American reality television series
A&E (TV network) original programming
English-language television shows
Television series by Banijay